De La Salle Lipa College of Law is the law school of De La Salle Lipa, a Lasallian educational institution located in Lipa City, Batangas, Philippines.

History
The college started accepting applicants in Academic Year (AY) 2009-2010 and started its classes in AY 2010-2011 with the Juris Doctor program, a four-year professional degree. Originally, the college first offered the  Bachelor of Laws degree in 2010, but
efforts to enrich its curriculum were made such that the program was revised, changing into the Doctor of Jurisprudence program.

References

External links
De La Salle Lipa official website

Law schools in the Philippines
Schools in Batangas
De La Salle Philippines
Educational institutions established in 2009
2009 establishments in the Philippines